Tolucheyevo is a rural locality (a selo) in Kolodeyevskoye Rural Settlement, Buturlinovsky District, Voronezh Oblast, Russia. The population was 86 as of 2010.

Geography 
Tolucheyevo is located 40 km east of Buturlinovka (the district's administrative centre) by road. Kucheryayevka is the nearest rural locality.

References 

Rural localities in Buturlinovsky District